TAAG Angola Airlines E.P. is a state-owned airline and flag carrier of Angola. Based in Luanda, the airline operates domestic services within Angola, medium-haul services in Africa and long-haul services to Brazil, Cuba, and Portugal. The airline was originally set up by the government as DTADivisão dos Transportes Aéreos in 1938, rechristened TAAG Angola Airlines in 1973, and gained flag carrier status in 1975.  It is now a member of both the International Air Transport Association and the African Airlines Association.

History

DTADivisão dos Transportes Aéreos (1938–1973)

The origins of the carrier can be traced back to 1937, when the president of Portugal Óscar Carmona asked Joaquim de Almedia Baltazar to create an airline in Angola. In September 1938, DTADivisão dos Transportes Aéreos was formed as a division of the Administration of Railways, Harbours, and Air Transport of Portuguese West Africa. It was owned and run by the government, which authorised the acquisition of three Dragons and two Junkers Ju 52s, although the latter two aircraft were not delivered due to the outbreak of the Second World War. Operations began on 17 July 1940, using De Havilland Dragon Rapide biplanes. The first routes to be operated were founded by the Aero Club of Angola and included two main lines: one running between Luanda and Pointe Noire, having connections with Aeromaritime services to Europe, and the other being Luanda–Benguela–Lobito that was later extended to Moçâmedes. Flights were intermittently discontinued during World War II due to the scarcity of spare parts, but by the end of the war, the airline resumed operations. Two Stinson Reliants bought from the Belgian Congo in 1944 permitted the carrier to resume coastal services. The DC-3 and the Beechcraft Model 18 joined the fleet in 1946. In  that year, a new route to Leopoldville was launched. The airline joined the International Air Transport Association in 1951. Also in that year, the company extended the Leopoldville route further east, serving Lourenço Marques, but this destination was later abandoned due to poor financial performance. DTA also operated a route linking Luanda with Lourenço Marques via Livingstone between 1951 and 1952; poor sales prompted the airline to terminate the service.

By , the fleet was composed of four Beech 18s, seven DC-3s and three DH.89s. A year later, DTA became the third African airline in ordering the Fokker F-27, with two aircraft acquired. The F-27s were incorporated into the fleet in 1962. Served with these brand new aircraft, Windhoek was added to the route network that year.

TAAG Angola Airlines (1973–)

Following renaming to TAAGTransportes Aéreos de Angola on 1 October 1973, the airline was reorganised and reconstituted. The company shareholders at the time were the Angolan government (51%), TAP Air Portugal (29%) and ex-DTA employees (20%). Four Boeing 737-200s were ordered in 1974. The same year, a new livery including the Palança Negra was unveiled. In , the company took delivery of the first Boeing 737-200. In , the delivery of two Boeing 737-200Cs was blocked by the US State Department; the embargo was lifted two months later following the end of the civil war in the country. Valued at around  million, these two aircraft were finally delivered by late  that year. In  the same year, an ex-Allegheny Airlines Fairchild FH-227 on delivery flight to Suidwes Lugdiens was forced to land at Luanda while flying over Angolan territory. The country seized control of the aircraft, which was later reported to be in service with TAAG, along with an ex-Argentine Air Force Caravelle and two ex-THY Turkish Airlines F-27s. Three Yak-40s entered the fleet in 1977, along with other Soviet-built aircraft; late this year, an ex-British Caledonian Airways Boeing 707-320C was sold to TAAG. In 1978, TAAG acquired two used F27s from Fokker, and another Boeing 737 was ordered a year later. A Lockheed L-100-20, registration D2-FAF, was involved in an accident while landing at São Tomé.

By , the carrier had a fleet of three Boeing 707-320Cs, three Boeing 737-200Cs, six Fokker F27s —four -600s and two -200s—, three L-100s —two -20s and one -30— and four Yakovlev Yak-40s to serve a number of domestic destinations, plus Brazzaville, São Tome, Lagos, Maputo, Lisbon, Moscow, Paris and Rome. The company was reorganised again during the year. On 8 June, a Yak-40 (registration D2-TYC) crashed near Matala killing all 19 occupants on board. On 16 May 1981, the crew of four on board a Lockheed L-100-20 Hercules, registration D2-EAS, lost their lives in an accident at Mongua. During the early 1980s, the fleet also included a small number of Antonov An-26s that started being phased out. One of these examples (D2-TAB) was involved in an accident at Monte Bibala on 29 November 1982; 15 people lost their lives. Another fatal accident took place almost a year later, on 8 November 1983, when the crash of a Boeing 737-200 (D2-TBN) at Lubango resulted in 130 fatalities. Serious financial difficulties were uncovered during 1984. In the mid-1980s, an L-100 Hercules was withdrawn from service and two Ilyushin Il-62Ms were acquired for operations to Cuba. The carrier phased in the first of these two aircraft in 1988.

At , TAAG Angola Airlines had TAAG-Air Charter and TAAG Aviacao Ligeira as associated companies; the number of employees was 5,770. At this time, the fleet consisted of  Boeing 707-320s ( -320B and  -320Cs),  Boeing 737-200s,  Boeing 737-200C,  Lockheed L100-200,  Fokker F.27s ( -100,  -400M,  -500 and  -600s) and  Yakovlev Yak-40s. The carrier network comprised  domestic points in Angola served from Luanda plus international flights to Berlin-Schonefeld, Brazzaville, Havana, Kinshasa, Lisbon, Lusaka, Maputo, Moscow, Paris, Rio de Janeiro, Rome, Sal and Sao Tome. On 31 January 1995, a Boeing 727-200, registration D2-TJB, crashed on landing at Huambo; the landing gear was torn off following the aircraft aquaplaning off the runway as a result of a long landing. There were no serious injuries among the occupants of the aircraft. TAAG bought a Boeing 747-300 Combi from Singapore Airlines in 1997.

In , TAAG Angola Airlines ordered three Boeing 777-200ERs and four Boeing 737-700s, it also took options on one and two more of these aircraft, respectively. The new aircraft were aimed at replacing the ageing Boeing 747-300s and Boeing 737-200s. The order was partially fulfilled in November 2006, when two Boeing 777-200ERs and three 737-700s were delivered. One of these Boeing 777-200ERs established a record-breaking distance for the delivery of the type, when it flew  between Seattle and Luanda in 16 hours and 47 minutes. In , the Boeing 747-300 fleet was retired from service. In  the same year, the airline received its first newly acquired Boeing 777-300ER, out of two ordered in October 2009; TAAG became the first African carrier in purchasing and operating this type of aircraft.

European Union ban (2007) and subsequent restructuring

At the same time, the United Kingdom barred TAAG from flying into its territory, just before the airline was about to start services to London-Gatwick; in retaliation, Angola banned British Airways from landing within the country's borders. The carrier announced it was losing  million a month owing to the ban. To continue operating flights to Europe, TAAG wet-leased a Boeing 747-400 from South African Airways (SAA). Following the EU ban, in November 2008 the entire TAAG board was replaced and a new board was appointed with the objective of turning the carrier round, and in particular getting it removed from the EU blacklist. At the time, according to the Transport Minister, Augusto da Silva Tomás, in 14 months the company lost about US$70 million (€55.6 million). The turn-round plan included staff reductions – before the action was taken, there were about 5,000 staff. During 2008, TAAG launched a new route to Beijing.

It was announced in May 2009 that TAAG had passed IATA inspections. In , TAAG received permission to operate flights to Europe under restricted conditions, as it was allowed to fly only into Portugal and using only its three Boeing 777s. This partial lift of the ban made TAAG the only Angolan airline that was permitted to operate into the EU. After nearly two years of being banned from EU airspace, TAAG deployed its own aircraft on the European corridor immediately. TAAG then returned the Boeing 747-400 to South African Airways. In November 2009, the European Commission extended the permission to TAAG's four Boeing 737-700s. Also in November 2009, TAAG restarted services to Havana; many Cuban doctors and teachers reside in Angola and the flight exists to help transport them. In late March 2010, restrictions over TAAG operations were relaxed again following the announcement the airline could fly its Boeing 777-200ERs and 737-700s to all European airports.

In December 2010, two engine incidents involving TAAG's Boeing 777-200ERs forced the carrier to ground the three aircraft of the type.

In , the ban was partially lifted, but some aircraft were still prevented to fly the European Air Space.

On 17 April 2019, the ban was completely lifted, allowing TAAG to fly all of its aircraft to any EU country.

Emirates management agreement, 2014–2017
In late , a ten-year management concession agreement between Emirates and the Government of Angola was signed; the deal also covered flight codesharing and the coordination of frequent flier programmes. In the first full year of operation under the agreement, annual losses were cut from $175m to $5m; the Ernst & Young-audited figures for January to December 2016 were approved at the airline's Board meeting on 9 March 2017.

The contract was unilaterally terminated by Emirates in 2017 after the Emirati carrier found difficulties in expatriating around  million in revenues from Angola.

Corporate affairs

Ownership, management and structure
Originally set up within a government department, TAAG Angola Airlines remains 100% owned by the government of Angola. TAAG is itself the sole owner of Angola Air Charter, also based in Luanda, that operates cargo charters in Africa.

, Joaquim Teixeira da Cunha holds the chairman and chief executive officer position. Vipula Gunatilleka holds the chief financial officer position, .

Business trends
Annual reports for the airline do not appear to be published. In the absence of these, the main sources for trends are press reports, and industry reports of the fleet size; even these are only indicative, because it is not always clear whether the aircraft recorded are actually in service.  Available figures (for year ending 31 December) are:

Head office

TAAG has its corporate headquarters in Luanda, Angola. The airline also has offices in Africa, Asia, Europe, and North and South America, and opened an office in Chaoyang District, Beijing, in 2010.

Destinations 

, TAAG Angola Airlines serves 31 destinations, including 13 domestic, 11 in Africa, three in Latin America, two in Schengen Europe, and three in the Middle East and the Asia-Pacific region.

Codeshare agreements
TAAG Angola Airlines has codeshare agreements with the following airlines:

 Air France
 British Airways
 Brussels Airlines
 Kenya Airways
 KLM
 LAM Mozambique Airlines
 Lufthansa
 Royal Air Maroc
 South African Airways

Fleet

Current fleet

TAAG operates the following aircraft (as of July 2022):

Historical fleet
The company previously operated the following aircraft:

 Airbus A340-300
 Antonov An-26
 Boeing 707-320B
 Boeing 707-320C
 Boeing 727-100C
 Boeing 737-200 Advanced
 Boeing 737-200C
 Boeing 747-300
 Boeing 747-300 Combi
 Boeing 747-400
 Caravelle
 Douglas C-47A
 Douglas DC-8-30
 Douglas DC-8-50
 Fokker 50
 Fokker F27-100
 Fokker F27-200
 Fokker F27-400
 Fokker F27-500
 Fokker F27-600
 Ilyushin Il-62M
 Lockheed L-100-20
 Lockheed L-100-30
 Lockheed L-1011-500
 Yakovlev Yak-40

In-flight service
TAAG Angola Airlines became OnAir first Sub-Saharan customer. The carrier plans to offer inflight connectivity on board the Boeing 777-300ER fleet starting .

First Class
First Class, branded as Diamond First Class, is available only on TAAG's Boeing 777 aircraft. First class features fully flat-bed seats with AVOD in-flight entertainment. Additionally, amenity kits, pillows, and blankets are given to first class passengers. Passengers also have designated check-in desks and have access to TAAG's Welwitchia Lounge in Luanda Airport.

Business Class
Business Class, known as Executiva Class, is found on all TAAG aircraft. On the Boeing 777 fleet, the seats are angled lie-flat with AVOD in-flight entertainment in each seat. Amenity kits, pillows, and blankets are given to all Business Class passengers. Additionally, they are entitled to priority check-in and also have access to TAAG's Welwitchia Lounge in Luanda Airport.

Economy Class

Branded as HighFly Economic Class, TAAG's long-haul economy class cabin is equipped with AVOD in-flight entertainment. The seats feature footrests and winged headrests for extra comfort. Pillows and blankets are given to all economy class passengers, and hot meals are served on all international flights.

In-Flight Entertainment
All TAAG long-haul aircraft are equipped with AVOD entertainment throughout all cabins. Known as Palanca, there are two variations throughout the Boeing 777 fleet. Rockwell Collins' dTES system is installed on the B777-200ERs, while the newer B777-300ERs possess the Thales TopSeries™ Audio Video On-demand System. The B737-700 fleet features drop-down LCD screens, used to show cabin-wide movies and a moving map display. Additionally, TAAG has an in-flight magazine and an in-flight entertainment guide, both known as austral.

Accidents and incidents

Accidents involving fatalities
29 November 1982: An Antonov 26, registration D2-TAB, that operated a non-scheduled passenger service, flew into mountainous terrain and crashed. All 15 occupants of the aircraft perished in the accident.
14 April 1997: A Fokker F-27-600, tail number D2-TFP, operating a Brazzaville–Luanda cargo service, rolled right following rotation from Maya-Maya Airport, fell onto the runway it took off from and skidded until it came to rest past the end of it, breaking in two and bursting into flames. There were three reported fatalities.
28 June 2007: a Boeing 737-200 crashed in northern Angola. Portuguese news agency Lusa said the aircraft had taken off from the Angolan capital, Luanda, and was trying to land at M'banza-Kongo in the province of Zaire, which is in northern Angola near the border with the Democratic Republic of Congo. At least five people were killed and 66 injured. Among those killed in the accident was the municipal administrator of M'banza-Kongo and a senior Roman Catholic priest from Italy. The airplane was carrying 78 passengers when it crashed at 1330 local time (12.30 GMT). The agency said control of the aircraft was lost upon landing and it crashed into a building, destroying it. The director of Aeroportos de Angola (the Angolan airport authority) told national radio the pilot had missed the runway for an unknown reason while attempting an emergency landing. According to aviation sources in Luanda, the aircraft apparently punctured two tyres upon landing, causing one wing to dip and touch the runway. The aircraft then veered out of control and crashed into the building. Initial press reports indicated that the aircraft touched down about halfway along the runway while attempting to land at M'banza-Kongo.

Incidents involving fatalities
8 June 1980: A Yakovlev Yak-40K, registration D2-TYC, was shot down by a MiG-19 near Matala, Angola. There were 19 reported fatalities.
16 May 1981: A Lockheed L-100-20 Hercules, tail number D2-EAS, that was operating a freighter service, was shot down by a missile on approach to Menongue Airport. All four occupants of the aircraft perished in the incident.
8 November 1983: A Boeing 737-2M2, registration D2-TBN, crashed immediately after takeoff from Lubango Airport bound for Quatro de Fevereiro Airport; all 130 occupants of the aircraft —of whom 126 were passengers— died. UNITA guerrillas claimed to have shot down the airliner.

Incidents involving no fatalities

26 December 2002: A Boeing 737-2M2, registration D2-TBD, that had departed from Windhoek Hosea Kutako International Airport bound for Luanda operating Flight 572, was involved in a mid-air collision over Namibian airspace with a Cessna 404, registration V5-WAA, that took off from Windhoek Eros Airport. The Boeing sustained minor damage to one of its wings, but continued its flight to Luanda; the pilot of the Cessna —the only occupant of the light aircraft— managed to land it safely despite the damage it sustained in the incident. All occupants from both aircraft survived unharmed.

Non-fatal hull-losses
15 May 1979: A Lockheed L-100-20 Hercules, registration D2-FAF, crashed on landing at São Tomé International Airport.
4 November 1980: A Boeing 737-2M2C, tail number D2-TAA, that landed short of the runway at Benguela Airport, slid some 900 m following the collapse of the gear; a fire broke out on the right wing but there were no reported fatalities. The aircraft caught fire during recovery operations on 10 November, and was written off.
9 February 1984: A Boeing 737-2M2, registration D2-TBV, that departed from Albano Machado Airport operating a scheduled passenger service, suffered hydraulic problems following an explosion in the rear of the aircraft and returned to the airport of departure for an emergency landing. The plane touched down fast and overran the runway.
8 January 1988: A Yakovlev Yak-40K, tail number D2-TYD, ran off the runway upon landing at Quatro de Fevereiro Airport.
8 February 1988: A Boeing 707-349C, registration D2-TOI, had its hydraulic and control lines broken after it hit an antenna on approach to Quatro de Fevereiro Airport; the nosegear collapsed when it overran the runway.
20 February 1992: A Boeing 707-349C, tail number D2-TOJ, experienced a nosegear failure during taxiing at Quatro de Fevereiro Airport.

See also 

 Airlines of Africa
 Transport in Angola

References

Bibliography

External links 

  TAAG Angola Airlines (Brazil Website)

 
Airlines of Angola
Airlines established in 1938
Airlines formerly banned in the European Union
Companies based in Luanda
Government-owned airlines
Angolan brands
1938 establishments in Angola